The Campion Cycle Company was a British bicycle, cyclecar and motor cycle maker, active from 1893 to 1926 and based in Nottingham, England. In 1927 it was purchased by Currys.

Motor cycles
Campion motorcycles used a variety of proprietary engines including Minerva, MMC, Fafnir, Precision, Villiers, Blackburne and JAP.

They also supplied frames to other companies.

Campion Cyclecar
The Cyclecar was made only in 1913 and was powered by a JAP V twin with a rating of 8 hp. It used a friction transmission system and drove the rear wheels by a belt.

See also

List of bicycle manufacturing companies
 List of car manufacturers of the United Kingdom

References

Defunct motorcycle manufacturers of the United Kingdom
Defunct motor vehicle manufacturers of England
Defunct cycle manufacturers of the United Kingdom
Cyclecars
Manufacturing companies based in Nottingham
Vehicle manufacturing companies established in 1901
Vehicle manufacturing companies disestablished in 1927
1901 establishments in England
1927 disestablishments in England
British companies disestablished in 1927
British companies established in 1893